Saint Peter the Hermit of Galatia near Antioch, in Byzantine Syria, lived in the early fifth century AD.

Peter's life is recorded by Theodoret of Cyrrhus whose own family was touched by the saint's gifts of healing.

Saint Peter the Hermit left his home at a very early age and lived as a wandering monk for many years travelling extensively throughout the Middle-East.  Eventually he settled near Antioch where he lived a very strict asceticism and became known for his holiness.

Peter the Hermit of Galatia near Antioch is commemorated 1 February by the Eastern Orthodox and Byzantine Catholic Churches.

See also

Christian monasticism
Stylites

References
Orthodox Church in America

Byzantine hermits
5th-century Christian saints